Menominee is an unincorporated community in Cedar County, Nebraska, United States.

History
A post office was established at Menominee in 1872, and remained in operation until it was discontinued in 1902.

References

Unincorporated communities in Cedar County, Nebraska
Unincorporated communities in Nebraska